Holcombe Hockey Club is a field hockey club based in Rochester, Kent, England. The home ground is located at Holcombe Park, where there is a water-based pitch, a sand-based pitch and a clubhouse. The club was formed in 1999/2000 from a merger of clubs in the area.

The Men's 1st XI play in the Men's England Hockey League, and the Ladies 1st Team play in the Women's England Hockey League.
The club is one of the largest in the UK, with ten men's sides, five ladies' sides, and various other sides.

Squads

Men's First Team Squad 2021–22 season

Ladies First Team Squad 2021–22 season

Notable players

Men's internationals

 David Ames
 Iain Lewers 

 Stephane Vehrle-Smith

 Gareth Carr
 Denzil Dolley
 Ryan Ravenscroft

Women's internationals

 

 Emily Maguire
 Sarah Robertson

 Sarah Jones 
 Rose Thomas  

 Nicola Daly 
 Megan Frazer

 Dirkie Chamberlain

References

 
English field hockey clubs
Field hockey clubs established in 1999
1999 establishments in England
Sport in Kent